The table of years in country music is a tabular display of all years in country music, to provide an overview and quick navigation to any year.

Other years in country music
Prior to 1920 in country music

20th century starting with 1920 

 1920
 1921
 1922
 1923
 1924
 1925
 1926
 1927
 1928
 1929
 1930
 1931
 1932
 1933
 1934
 1935
 1936
 1937
 1938
 1939 
 1940
 1941
 1942
 1943
 1944
 1945
 1946
 1947
 1948
 1949
 1950
 1951
 1952
 1953
 1954
 1955
 1956
 1957
 1958
 1959
 1960
 1961
 1962
 1963
 1964
 1965
 1966
 1967
 1968
 1969
 1970
 1971
 1972
 1973
 1974
 1975
 1976
 1977
 1978
 1979
 1980
 1981
 1982
 1983
 1984
 1985
 1986
 1987
 1988
 1989
 1990
 1991
 1992
 1993
 1994
 1995
 1996
 1997
 1998
 1999
 2000

21st century 

 2001
 2002
 2003
 2004
 2005
 2006
 2007
 2008
 2009
 2010
 2011
 2012
 2013
 2014
 2015
 2016
 2017
 2018
 2019
 2020
 2021
 2022

See also
List of years in country music

  
Country music
Tables of years